Racopilum is a genus of mosses belonging to the family Racopilaceae.

The species of this genus are found in Southern Hemisphere.

The genus name of Racopilum refers to the combination of two Greek words; rhakos meaning rag or remnant, and also pilos meaning felt cap, which alludes to basally torn calyptra (cap-like structure) of some taxa.

Species
As accepted by GBIF;

 Racopilum africanum 
 Racopilum angustistipulaceum 
 Racopilum angustistipulaceum 
 Racopilum anomalum 
 Racopilum arcuatum 
 Racopilum aristatum 
 Racopilum aubertii 
 Racopilum ayresii 
 Racopilum brevipes 
 Racopilum buettneri 
 Racopilum capense 
 Racopilum cardotii 
 Racopilum chevalieri 
 Racopilum convolutaceum 
 Racopilum crassicuspidatum 
 Racopilum crinitum 
 Racopilum cuspidigerum 
 Racopilum cuspidigerum var. convolutaceum 
 Racopilum ellipticum 
 Racopilum epiphyllosum 
 Racopilum fernandezianum 
 Racopilum ferriei 
 Racopilum floridae 
 Racopilum francii 
 Racopilum gracile 
 Racopilum gracillimum 
 Racopilum gracillimum 
 Racopilum integrum 
 Racopilum intermedium 
 Racopilum laxirete 
 Racopilum leptocarpum 
 Racopilum leptotapes 
 Racopilum macrocarpum 
 Racopilum madagassum 
 Racopilum magnirete 
 Racopilum marginatum 
 Racopilum mauritianum 
 Racopilum microdictyon 
 Racopilum microides 
 Racopilum microphyllum 
 Racopilum mougeotianum 
 Racopilum mucronatum 
 Racopilum naumannii 
 Racopilum niutense 
 Racopilum niutensis 
 Racopilum ornithopodioides 
 Racopilum orthocarpioides 
 Racopilum orthocarpum 
 Racopilum pacificum 
 Racopilum pectinatum 
 Racopilum pectinatum 
 Racopilum penzigii 
 Racopilum perrieri 
 Racopilum plicatum 
 Racopilum polythrincium 
 Racopilum purpurascens 
 Racopilum robustum 
 Racopilum schmidii 
 Racopilum siamense 
 Racopilum spectabile 
 Racopilum speluncae 
 Racopilum speluncae 
 Racopilum squarrifolium 
 Racopilum strumiferum 
 Racopilum thomeanum 
 Racopilum tomentosum 
 Racopilum tubiforme 
 Racopilum ugandae 
 Racopilum verrucosum

References

Dicranales
Moss genera